The Mackellar Girls Campus of Northern Beaches Secondary College is a government-funded single-sex comprehensive secondary day school for girls only, located in Manly Vale, a suburb on the Northern Beaches of Sydney, New South Wales, Australia.  

Established in 1968 as Manly Vale High School, and then became Mackellar Girls High School, named in honour of Dorothea Mackellar, the school caters for approximately 1,200 students from Year 7 and Year 12. The school is operated by the New South Wales Department of Education; the principal is Christine Del Gallo.

Overview
Mackellar Girls Campus is a part of the Northern Beaches Secondary College, a five-campus college across Sydney's Northern Beaches, formed in 2003. It is generally considered to be the brother school to Balgowlah Boys Campus, another school within the College.

Mackellar Girls Campus was formerly known as Manly Vale High School, and then became Mackellar Girls High School until 2003 when it gained its current name after the famous Australian poet, Dorothea Mackellar. Under the name Manly Vale High School, the school was believed to have been reinvented as a girls home economics school in 1967 upon the thought of creating strong and diligent girls to enter the work-force. The exact history of Mackellar as a school is not well-known, but it is believed to have been a school prior to 1967, rather as a co-educational school. Prior to being established at the site in manly vale, it was a co-educational campus at the current location of primary school, Manly Village Public School. 

The school's unofficial motto, 'Mackellar Girls can do anything' was borne when the school expanded from a home economics school to include mathematics and science subjects not traditionally taught to girls, and the students were told they could now "do anything".

In 2015 it was ranked as the third top comprehensive girls' school in New South Wales. It was 116th in the NSW Higher School Certificate (HSC) rankings in 2015.

Houses
Mackellar has a house system to facilitate school based competitions and activities. House activities include athletics, swimming carnivals and other sport related events. The school currently has four houses created based on the Aboriginal meanings for Australian native birds:
  BeabauKing parrot
  GullaryWhite crane
  MoolgoriBlack swan
  TingeeBlack cockatoo

Notable alumni
Layne Beachleyprofessional surfer, seven-time World Champion.
Elka GrahamOlympic swimmer, television presenter.
Debbie WatsonOlympic water polo player, captained the winning Australian Waterpolo team at the Sydney Olympics 2000.
 Brooke Hanson – Olympic gold medalist in swimming. Former world-record holder.
Keli Lane – Former water polo coach and Convicted potential baby murderer.

See also

 List of government schools in New South Wales
 Education in Australia

References

External links

Girls' schools in New South Wales
Public high schools in Sydney
Educational institutions established in 1968
1968 establishments in Australia